FC Järfälla Academy is a Swedish football club located in Järfälla.

Season to season

Current squad

References

Football clubs in Stockholm County